Pastores gregis, subtitled "The Bishop, Servant of the Gospel of Jesus Christ for the Hope of the World," is a post-synod apostolic exhortation released on October 16, 2003 by Pope John Paul II. It offers doctrinal and pastoral principles intended to guide Catholic bishops. The document resulted from an ordinary general assembly of bishops, held from September 30 to October 27, 2001. The synod, which was held shortly after the September 11 attacks, discussed episcopal service in view of Christian hope.

The publication date of Pastores gregis marked John Paul II's 25th anniversary as Bishop of Rome. It was his final apostolic exhortation.

References

External links
 Official English text

2003 documents
2003 in Christianity
Apostolic exhortations
Documents of Pope John Paul II